Dobromir (Добромир) - is a Slavic origin given name built of two elements: dobro "good" + mir "world, peace". Feminine form is: Dobromira.

Notable bearers:

Dobromir Chrysos, leader of the Vlachs
Dobromir Mitov, retired Bulgarian football defender and currently coach of Belasitsa Petrich
Dobromir Tashkov, former Bulgarian football player
Dobromir Zhechev, Bulgarian former football player and later manager

See also

Slavic names

External links
https://web.archive.org/web/20110707203359/http://www.babynamestory.com/meaning/Dobromir_name.html

Slavic masculine given names
Bulgarian masculine given names